Mieke Mosmuller-Crull (born 1951 in Amsterdam as Mieke Crull) is a Dutch medical doctor, author, and novelist. Since 1994, she has written a number of books in Dutch, German, English, and Danish on themes related to Rudolf Steiner's anthroposophy.

Biography 
Mosmuller was a student at the Barlaeus Gymnasium in Amsterdam and then began a study of medicine at the University of Amsterdam. Together with her husband Jos Mosmuller, she began a practice as a general practitioner and opened an apothecary in Sittard.

Publications in English 
 The Living Rudolf Steiner. Apologia. Occident Publishers, 2013.
 Seek the Light that Rises in the West. Occident Publishers, 2012.
 Wisdom is a Woman. (A Novel.) Occident Publishers, 2015.

Publications in German 
 Die Kategorien des Aristoteles. Occident, Baarle-Nassau 2013.
 Arabeske – Das Integral Ken Wilbers. Occident, Baarle-Nassau 2009, .
 Stigmata und Geist-Erkenntnis. Judith von Halle versus Rudolf Steiner. Occident Verlag, Baarle-Nassau 2008, .
 Das Tor zur geistigen Welt. Occident, Baarle-Nassau 2010.
 Meditation. Occident, Baarle-Nassau 2010.
 Das menschliche Mysterium. Bildekräfte, Lebenskräfte, Gestaltung des menschlichen Leibes. Occident, Baarle-Nassau 2011.
 Anschauen des Denkens. Occident, Baarle-Nassau 2011.
 Rudolf Steiner, Eine spirituelle Biographie. Occident, Baarle-Nassau 2011.
 Begreifen des Denkens. Occident, Baarle-Nassau 2012.
 Eine Klasse voller Engel. Über die Erziehungskunst. Occident, Baarle-Nassau 2009.
 Ich mache was ich will! Freiheitsphilosophie für junge Menschen. Occident, Baarle-Nassau 2012.
 Ein Kind ist eine sichtbar gewordene Liebe. Occident, Baarle-Nassau 2013.

Novels 
 Inferno. Roman. Occident Verlag, Baarle-Nassau 2008, .
 Himmlische Rose. Occident, Baarle-Nassau 2010.
 Prometheus. Occident, Baarle-Nassau 2010.
 Johannes, Dialoge über die Einweihung. Occident, Baarle-Nassau 2012.

External links 
 .
 .
 Occident Publishers Occident Publishers
 Mieke Mosmullers Article Archive Article Archive at Occident Publishers
 Mieke Mosmullers Blog Official website

References 

Anthroposophic medicine practitioners
Dutch women writers
1951 births
Physicians from Amsterdam
Living people
Dutch general practitioners